A host of mythological creatures occur in the mythologies from the Philippines. Philippine mythological creatures are the mythological beasts, monsters, and enchanted beings of more than 140 ethnic groups in the Philippines. Each ethnic people has their own unique set of belief systems, which includes the belief in various mythological creatures. The list does not include figures such as gods, goddesses, deities, and heroes; for these, see List of Philippine mythological figures.

General terms
Some mythological creatures, aside from their specific name, are also referred through a generic term which encompasses other similar mythological creatures. Some of these terms include:

Aswang: bracket term for shape-shifting creatures that have a variety of forms, such as the blood-sucking vampire, the self-segmenting viscera sucker, the man-eating weredog, the vindictive or evil-eye witch, and the carrion-eating ghoul.
Duwende: bracket term for small magical beings of the land.
Engkanto: bracket term for highly-attractive enchanted human-like environmental beings, usually exuding the scent of flowers and having no philthrum.
Higante: bracket term for giant humanoid land creatures.
Sirena: bracket term for water creatures with a humanoid upper body and the body of a fish from the waist down, similar to merfolk.

Most creatures originating from Philippine mythology, however, are not under any specific bracket term.

Creatures of the soil

Agta: Another name for kapre
Alan: deformed, winged spirits with fingers and toes that point backwards
Amalanhig: failed aswangs who rise from their graves to kill via neck bite
Amomongo: a man-sized ape with long nails
Anggitay: female beings like centaurs, the opposite of tikbalang
Bal-Bal: an undead monster that feeds on corpses
Batibat: demons in the form of obese hags 
Berbalang: ghouls
Bungisngis: one-eyed giant, purported to dwell in Meluz, Orion, Bataan, and Cebu; described as always laughing.
Busaw: cannibalistic creatures who resemble humans
Dalaketnon: evil engkanto
Diwata: (from Sanskrit devata, "gods"), engkantada (from Spanish encantada, "enchantress, charmed") or engkanto (from Spanish encanto, "spell, incantation, charm") are gods and goddesses below the supreme deity or deities; some are similar to dryads who guard natural creations such as forests, seas, mountains, land and air; fair-skinned, good-looking and, sometimes, blonde-haired. reside in large trees, such as acacia and balete, and tend to be resentful of humanity's intrusion into their realm
Dwende: goblins, hobgoblins, elves or dwarfs (Spanish: duende " little creatures who provide good fortune or foretell an ominous fate to people. goblin, elf, charm" < "duen de (casa)", owner of the house); there are two types of Dwende the white and black, white Dwende represent as good motive and the black is a bad,
Kapre:  muscular tree giants described as being a tall (7 to 9 ft), big, black, terrifying, and hairy
Mambabarang: witches who utilize insects to do their bidding
Mangkukulam: bruha (from Spanish: bruja, "witch") are witches, wizards, bruho (Spanish:brujo, "wizard, male witch"), or sorcerers who cast evil spells to humans; also called manggagaway
Multo: is a term used to describe the spirit of a dead person or animal that visually appears in the lives of people that are still alive.
Nuno sa punso: (literally, goblin of the mound) goblins or elves who live within mysterious lumps of soil (ant hills); provide a person who steps on their shelter with good luck or misfortune
Pugot: a shapeshifting fiend whose true shape is that of a gigantic black headless creature
Santelmo: Saint Elmo's fire
Sarangay: a creature like a minotaur with jewels attached to its ears
Sigbin: a goat with very large ears, a long whip-like tail that emits a foul stench and two grasshopper-like legs on its neck that enable it to jump far distances. It is also known to crabwalk backward. They wander around at night in search of children to devour but they keep the hearts to make amulets.
Tikbalang: lurk in the mountains and forests; a tall, bony humanoid creature with the head and hooves of a horse and disproportionately long limbs, to the point that its knees reach above its head when it squats down
Tiyanak: un-baptized newborn baby that tricks and preys on people that are usually lost in the woods.

Creatures of the water

Berberoka: monsters that hunt by draining ponds and then spewing them back out, drowning those who go to pick up the fish left behind in the drained pond
Kataw: merfolk
Sirena: sea creatures with a human upper body and a fish tail lower extremities
Siyokoy: Sea creatures that are usually illustrated as green-skinned humanoids with scales, webbed limbs, and fins. Sometimes incorrectly depicted as the male counterpart of the Sirena.

Creatures of the air

Bakunawa: A serpentine dragon, described as a gargantuan creature that devours the moon
Garuda
Manananggal: derived from the word, tanggal, which means "to separate" because of their ability to separate from their lower body part
Manaul: a sacred bird
Minokawa: A gigantic avian dragon creature that devours the sun. A direct counterpart of the Bakunawa
Sarimanok: papanok in its feminine form, is a legendary multi-colored bird or chicken
Tigmamanukan: a bird seen as an omen
Wakwak: a vampiric bird that snatches people at night
Magpukatod: the horse that jumps over mountains.

See also
List of Philippine mythological figures
Ghosts in Filipino culture
Philippine mythology

References

Main